Ciprian Rus (born 1 March 1991) is a Romanian professional footballer who plays as a forward for Viitorul Târgu Jiu.

Honours

Dunărea Călărași
Liga II: 2017–18

UTA Arad
Liga II: 2019–20

References

External links
 
 

1991 births
Living people
Romanian footballers
Liga I players
Liga II players
CS Șoimii Pâncota players
FC UTA Arad players
ASA 2013 Târgu Mureș players
CS Pandurii Târgu Jiu players
FC Dunărea Călărași players
ACS Viitorul Târgu Jiu players
Association football forwards
Sportspeople from Arad, Romania